The Colonial League is an athletic conference consisting of 14 high schools mostly from the Lehigh Valley portion of eastern Pennsylvania. It is part of District XI of the Pennsylvania Interscholastic Athletic Association. The Colonial League is designed for mid and small-size schools in the Lehigh Valley. The largest 18 schools in the Lehigh Valley and Pocono region compete in the Eastern Pennsylvania Conference, one of the premiere athletic divisions in the nation.

History
In 1975, nine schools from the Lehigh Valley region of eastern Pennsylvania merged to form the Colonial League. Since then, a total of five teams have joined the league, with one team leaving.

Charter members
The Colonial League was founded in 1975, with the following teams as charter members:
Bangor Area High School
Catasauqua High School
Nazareth Area High School
Palisades High School
Pen Argyl Area High School
Salisbury High School
Saucon Valley High School
Southern Lehigh High School
Wilson Area High School
Prior to joining the Colonial League, these schools were part of the Lehigh Valley Conference or the Lehigh-Northampton League for interscholastic activities. As years went on, the member schools of these leagues began to vary greatly in school sizes and athletic competition levels.. The smaller schools of each league broke away and formed the Colonial League while others became members of the Centennial League. Some joined the Eastern Pennsylvania Conference, which includes the Lehigh Valley's largest high schools and a very high level of athletic competition.

1994 additions and departure
In 1994, Northern Lehigh High School, Northwestern Lehigh High School, Notre Dame High School, and Palmerton High School all joined the Colonial League.

Nazareth Area High School in Nazareth, meanwhile, departed the Colonial League in 1994 to begin competing with larger Lehigh Valley high schools in the Lehigh Valley Conference, which later became the Eastern Pennsylvania Conference.

2014 addition and departure 
In 2014, Moravian Academy in Bethlehem joined the Colonial League and Notre Dame High School in East Stroudsburg departed it.

See also
Eastern Pennsylvania Conference
Mountain Valley Conference
PIAA District 11

References

External links
Official website

Pennsylvania high school sports conferences
Pennsylvania Interscholastic Athletic Association
Bucks County, Pennsylvania
Carbon County, Pennsylvania
Lehigh County, Pennsylvania
Northampton County, Pennsylvania
Sports in the Lehigh Valley